is a Japanese voice actor affiliated with Mausu Promotion.

Filmography

Anime
1999
Devil Lady (Young Man)

2002
Ghost in the Shell: Stand Alone Complex (Paz)
Tokyo Underground (Henchman)
Secret of Cerulean Sand (Jack)

2003
Saiyuki Reload (Iwayoukai)

2004
Ghost in the Shell: Stand Alone Complex 2nd GIG (Paz)
Saiyuki Gunlock (Boatman)
Mujin Wakusei Survive (Newscaster)

2005
Gallery Fake (Keeper)

2007
The Skull Man (Believer)
Naruto Shippūden (Yaoki)
Heroic Age (Colonis Special Envoy)

2008
Rosario + Vampire (Bosaburo Taira)
Rosario + Vampire Capu2 (Bosaburo Taira)

2009
Slap Up Party: Arad Senki (Nathaniel)
Kurokami The Animation (Pupil)

2010
Chu-Bra!! (Komachi's older brother)

2011
Cardfight!! Vanguard (Hikaru Kurosawa)

2013
Star Blazers 2199 (Paren Nelge)
Buddy Complex (Mikhailov)

2014
Gundam Reconguista in G (Pilot)
Captain Earth (Haruhiko Kariya)
Haikyu!! (Kaname Moniwa)

2020
Ghost in the Shell: SAC 2045 (Paz)

Dubbing roles

Live-action
30 Minutes or Less (Travis Cord (Nick Swardson))
The Breakfast Club (Brian Johnson (Anthony Michael Hall))
Captain America: The First Avenger (Footer (Jean Paul))
Chuck (Devon Woodcomb (Ryan McPartlin))
City of God (Buscapé (Alexandre Rodrigues))
Drag Me to Hell (Professor Clay Dalton (Justin Long))
The Five-Year Engagement (Alex Eilhauer (Chris Pratt))
Gamer (Ken Castle (Michael C. Hall))
Gossip Girl (Lord Marcus Beaton (Patrick Heusinger))
How She Move (Quake (Brennan Gademans))
Napoleon Dynamite (Kipling "Kip" Dynamite (Aaron Ruell))
Oz (Kenny Wangler (J. D. Williams))
Six Feet Under (David Fisher (Michael C. Hall))
Power Rangers: Lost Galaxy (Damon Henderson)
Power Rangers: Lightspeed Rescue (Damon Henderson)
RV (Earl Gornicke (Hunter Parrish))
Shazam! (2021 THE CINEMA edition) (Adult Freddy Freeman (Adam Brody), Sid Sivana)
Six Feet Under (David Fisher (Michael C. Hall))
Slumdog Millionaire (Salim K. Malik (Madhur Mittal))
The Great Buck Howard (Troy Gable (Colin Hanks)
The Twilight Saga: New Moon (TV Tokyo edition) (Jacob Black (Taylor Lautner))
Wind Chill (Guy (Ashton Holmes))
X-Men: Apocalypse (Angel (Ben Hardy))

Animation
Teen Titans (Robin)
Teen Titans Go! (Robin)
The Batman (Robin/Dick Grayson)
Young Justice (Robin/Dick Grayson)

References

External links
 
 

Living people
1974 births
Japanese male voice actors
Male voice actors from Tokyo
20th-century Japanese male actors
21st-century Japanese male actors
Mausu Promotion voice actors